Ivan Alexandrovich Lekomtsev (born July 19, 1985) is a Russian professional ice hockey defenceman who is currently an unrestricted free agent. He most recently played under contract for the Severstal Cherepovets in the Kontinental Hockey League (KHL).

Lekomtsev joined Severstal as a free agent, signing a one-year deal on July 24, 2018. He previously spent the 2017–18 season split between HC Yugra and Lokomotiv Yaroslavl.

References

External links

1985 births
Living people
Avangard Omsk players
Avtomobilist Yekaterinburg players
HC Lada Togliatti players
Lokomotiv Yaroslavl players
HC Neftekhimik Nizhnekamsk players
Salavat Yulaev Ufa players
Severstal Cherepovets players
HC Sibir Novosibirsk players
HC Yugra players
Yunost Minsk players
Russian ice hockey defencemen